Len Hill (Lenard Winston Hill, 19412007) was a Welsh cricketer, footballer and tennis player.

Len Hill may also refer to:

 Len Hill (footballer) (Leonard George Hill, 18991979), English professional footballer
 Len Hill (Leonard W. Hill, 1911 or 19121981 or 1982), British birdlover, founder of Birdland Park and Gardens

See also
 Leonard Hill (disambiguation)
 Hill (surname)